Badegaon is a village in the Godawari Municipality of the Lalitpur District of Nepal. Badegaon is situated in the foothills of Phulchowki and is about 5 km south of Patan. It has five wards. Buddha Madhyamik Vidyalaya is in ward no. 3. It has one health post with 24 hours emergency services. Ex-Prime Minister & Nepali congress Leader Krishna Prasad Bhattarai has recently settled down in one of the jungles in Badegaon.

One of the great Buddha Stupa out of seven lies in this village. Initially, the name of the place was called Bandeshpur. It has one jungle which is of religious importance. It is said that it has got nine stony bhairab temple at its top and one can view Nyatapola Mandir of Bhaktapur from it. This is more like a moat surrounding the place. Some artefacts can even be seen at the site. Once in a landslide, in the south-east part of this jungle, a thick and very ancient wall was found but is taken off no care and is lied as it is. The historical value of the site is not given consideration by the local authority or government.

To the east of Badegaon village is Swetbarahi, one of the four Barahi of Kathmandu valley. People from the village celebrate Swetbarahi Jatra twice in a year.

Some common festivals that are celebrated by local people:

Gathemangal; a demon is from each small neighbourhood (local name is Tole) is dumped and later burned.

Naag Panchami: It is the day when serpents are worshipped.

Juga, Dashain, Tihar, Krishna Janmastami, Gaijatra, Janai Purnima, Yomari Purnima, Maghe Sankranti, Shree Panchami, Holi Purnima, Chaita Dashai, Ram Navami and Buddha Purnima.

Some touristic place and culture to see in Badegaon:
swet-barahi
bhairab jungle
Traditional buildings
Traditional food
Wood and metal carvings
Traditional handlooms for handicrafts

Gallery

References

Populated places in Lalitpur District, Nepal